Tommy Dwyer may refer to:

 Tommy Dwyer (hurler), Irish hurler
 Tommy Dwyer (American football) (1900–1967), American football, basketball, and baseball coach and civil engineer